Paul Waldman (born February 27, 1968) is a liberal / progressive American op-ed columnist and senior writer for The American Prospect, as well as a contributor to The Week and a blogger for the Washington Posts Plum Line blog.

Career
Waldman was formerly a senior researcher at the Annenberg Public Policy Center. From 2004 to 2009, he worked at Media Matters for America. In 2020, referencing a Ta-Nehisi Coates article which described Donald Trump as "the first white president", Waldman has proposed that Trump, drawing on decades of rhetoric which amplifies "whiteness as an identity and locus of oppression", has utilized white identity into a foundational aspect of his presidency.

Books
The Press Effect: Politicians, Journalists, and the Stories That Shape the Political World (2000, with Kathleen Hall Jamieson)
Fraud: The Strategy Behind the Bush Lies and why the Media Didn't Tell You (2004)
Being Right is Not Enough: What Progressives Must Learn From Conservative Success (2006)
Free Ride: John McCain and the Media (2008, with David Brock)

References

External links

Biography at the Week

1968 births
20th-century American Jews
21st-century American Jews
21st-century American non-fiction writers
Living people
American magazine journalists
American bloggers
Annenberg School for Communication at the University of Pennsylvania faculty